Lawstorant is a 2005 Polish-language romantic comedy film, directed by Mikołaj Haremski.

Fabule 
The film takes place in Warsaw. Fragles (Michał Wiśniewski) is the film's protagonist, a gambler and trader who is compelled to make a significant sum of money. He enters into business with Lawstorant, who planning life interest (in the role played by Zbigniew Buczkowski). Lawstorant, dreams of a beautiful arrangement of life, fascinated by the director of the bank. Fragles with Lawstorant lead a company with goal to make a fortune. Their plans crosses the head of a local criminal group - Caruso (Slawomir Orzechowski), demanding a share in the profits, and second Lawstorant asked the bank for a loan in the amount of four million dollars. Terrified man faces a dilemma to risk their lives or be gangsters, and thus implicate his woman to prison, to which it is bound.

Actors 
 Zbigniew Buczkowski as Lawstorant
 Michał Wiśniewski as Fragles
 Jolanta Mrotek as Monika
 Jerzy Trela as Notary
 Sławomir Orzechowski as "Caruso"
 Ireneusz Czop as "Dags"
 Tomasz Sapryk as Kazio Traczyk
 Henryk Gołębiewski as Bawół
 Bohdan Gadomski as Lawstorant's neighbour
 Małgorzata Socha as Jola
 Małgorzata Pieczyńska as Joanna Burska
 Joanna Liszowska as Marta
 Bohdan Łazuka as Sylwek
 Paweł Koślik as policeman
 Sławomir Sulej as policeman
 Sebastian Domagała as Lutek

References 

2005 films
Polish comedy films
Films shot in Warsaw
2000s Polish-language films